Zoltán Farkas (born 19 November 1974 in Sovata) is a Hungarian weightlifter. He holds the 69 kg Hungarian record. He competed two Olympic Games. In Atlanta finished 8th place in 59 kg category, four years later in Sydney finished 10th place in 62 kg category.

Sporting career
Farkas won three silver medal (snatch, clean & jerk, total) at the 1997 European Weightlifting Championships in Rijeka. One year later he won bronze medal in snatch at the European Championships.

Major results

References

External links
Zoltán Farkas at sports-reference.com

1974 births
Living people
Hungarian male weightlifters
Olympic weightlifters of Hungary
Weightlifters at the 2000 Summer Olympics
Weightlifters at the 1996 Summer Olympics
European Weightlifting Championships medalists
20th-century Hungarian people
21st-century Hungarian people